Olimpija Liepāja was a Latvian football club. It was based in Liepāja.

It won the Latvian Top League on seven occasions between 1927 and 1939. Otto Fischer moved in 1936 to Latvia, where he coached the team. Under him, the team did not lose a game as they won the League in Fischer's first season, and again in 1938 and 1939.

After the Soviet occupation of Latvia in 1940, the club was dissolved.

Honours
Latvian Top League:
Winners: 7 (1927–1929,1933, 1936, 1938–1939)

References

Sport in Liepāja
Defunct football clubs in Latvia